Qaiser Ali Khan (born 16 December 1971) is an Indian politician affiliated with the Indian National Congress party. He also serves as general secretary of the Bihar Pradesh Congress Committee.

Early life and education
Qaiser Ali Khan was born in Varisnagar, Samastipur, Bihar to Wajiha Khanam and Shaukat Ali Khan.

He did his schooling from Victoria Memorial English School, Patna and his graduation from Zakir Hussein College, Delhi University. In 2009, Khan established Y K Homes, a real estate firm.

References

1971 births
Living people